Aichkirchen is a village in the Upper Palatinate, Bavaria, Germany. It is part of the municipality Hemau.

Regensburg (district)